John Gardner Jamieson (February 14, 1925 – November 10, 2001) was a Canadian-American curler from Lynden, Washington. He was the second on the Granite Curling Club team (from Seattle, Washington, United States) during the World Curling Championships known as the 1961 Scotch Cup, where they won the bronze medal.

Jamieson grew up in Winnipeg and Victoria Beach, Manitoba. He served as a seaman with the Royal Canadian Navy in World War II. After exiting the Navy, he would work as an inspector with a phone company. In 1957, he moved to Everett, Washington to work for the West Coast Telephone Company. He then worked for Boeing before becoming the owner of the Riverside Tavern in Everett. After that, he became the owner of Wallace Poultry in Bellingham, Washington.

References

External links
 
Obituary

American male curlers
1925 births
2001 deaths
Curlers from Winnipeg
People from Lynden, Washington
Sportspeople from Everett, Washington
Canadian military personnel of World War II
Canadian emigrants to the United States
American curling champions